Ali Beyglu (also Romanized as ‘Alī Beyglū; also known as Albangī, Al’banglyu, Albengi, and ‘Alī Beglū) is a village in Guney-ye Markazi Rural District, in the Central District of Shabestar County, East Azerbaijan Province, Iran. At the 2006 census, its population was 1,683, in 435 families.

References 

Populated places in Shabestar County